Fitness bicycle may refer to:
 Stationary bicycle
 A type of hybrid bicycle which exhibits road bike speed and upright comfort join together for aggressive fitness rides or long commutes.